NGC 5962 is a spiral galaxy in the equatorial constellation of Serpens Caput. It was discovered by the Anglo-German astronomer William Herschel on March 21, 1784. It is the brightest member of the eponymously-named NGC 5962 group, which overlaps with the nearby NGC 5970 group; the two groups may be gravitationally bound.

The morphological (shape) class of NGC 5962 in the infrared is SAB(rs,nrl)c. This notation indicates the galaxy has a bar structure around the nucleus (SAB), an inner pseudo-ring likely associated with the outer Lindblad resonance (rs), a ring-lens structure at the nucleus (nrl), and loosely-wound spiral arms (c). In the optical band, this galaxy is classed as Hubble type SA(r)c, displaying an inner ring with no visible bar.

Along with a populated nucleus, it has a relatively large core, but a small central bulge, in which the spiral arms begin to unfurl. There is some evidence for a low level of nuclear activity, and it has been classed as a nuclear H II region galaxy. Based on its emission of far ultraviolet radiation, the pseudo-ring structure is actively undergoing star formation. The galaxy is forming stars at the rate of ·yr−1. There are two confirmed satellite galaxies; a third candidate proved to be too distant based on its redshift value.

Two Type II-P supernova events have been detected in this galaxy: SN 2016afa was discovered February 12, 2016, then SN 2017ivu was spotted December 11, 2017.

References

External links
 
 GALEX page on NGC 5962

Barred spiral galaxies
Serpens (constellation)
5962
55588
09926